Studená is a municipality and village in Jindřichův Hradec District in the South Bohemian Region of the Czech Republic. It has about 2,200 inhabitants.

Administrative parts
Villages of Domašín, Horní Bolíkov, Horní Pole, Maršov, Olšany, Skrýchov, Sumrakov, Světlá and Velký Jeníkov are administrative parts of Studená.

Twin towns – sister cities

Studená is twinned with:
 Beemster, Netherlands

References

Villages in Jindřichův Hradec District